= Château Lacave =

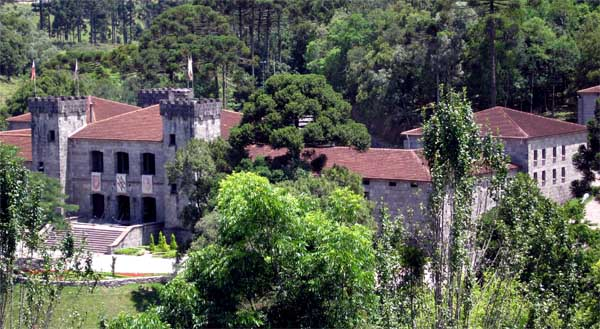
The Château Lacave Castle shown during the Brazilian summer in Caxias do Sul

Château Lacave is a medieval-style castle in the city of Caxias do Sul, Rio Grande do Sul, Brazil. The castle operated as a winery and also an events venue and restaurant. The castle is currently closed to visitors.

== History ==
Construction of Château Lacave began in 1968 and was completed in 1978. The castle is the work of Uruguayan Juan Carrau, who followed the original plan of an 11th-century Spanish medieval castle. The castle is built from basalt stone, native to the region. The stones were cut and fitted together without the use of any cement.

The original owner died in 1987, and the castle has changed hands over the years. Since 2021, the castle has belonged to the Famiglia Valduga winery.
